Valley Nature Center is a 6-acre park and nature preserve in Gibson City Park, Weslaco, Texas. Its focus is environmental education about the natural history of the Lower Rio Grande Valley.

The center's activities include a summer camp, weekly programs for all ages, birding trips, natural history classes and lectures.  There are programs for individuals, children and adults. There is a native plant nursery with plants for sale, a conservation resource library and a gift shop.

History 
Valley Nature Center has been in operation as a non-profit organization since 1984 and a new building was opened in 2014. Formed from a vacant lot, the site now includes a 1 mile trail through a cactus garden, bog ponds, and butterfly garden.

Fauna 
Insects, birds and animals that have been seen include Malachite butterfly and Melanis pixe butterfly, plain chachalaca, green jays, great kiskadees, buff-bellied hummingbird, Texas tortoise, Texas horned lizard, and Eastern Cottontail Rabbit. The park is considered a good site to view migrating birds and butterflies.

Botanical collection 
Botanical collection includes species native to Sabal Palm Grove, Arroyo Colorado brush, the Barretal, Coastal Lomas, and the Chihuahuan Thorn forest also known as Rio Grande-Falcon thorn woodland.

References

External links
 Valley Nature Center - official site

Nature centers in Texas
Museums in Hidalgo County, Texas
Education in Hidalgo County, Texas
Protected areas of Hidalgo County, Texas
Cactus gardens